Arnold Kadlec (born January 8, 1959 in Most, Czechoslovakia) is a retired Czechoslovak ice hockey player. He played for the Czechoslovakian team in the 1980 and 1984 Winter Olympics, winning a silver medal in 1984.

Career statistics

Regular season and playoffs

International

Sources
Arnold Kadlec at Hockey Reference.com

1959 births
Living people
Czech ice hockey defencemen
HC Litvínov players
HC Dukla Jihlava players
Ice hockey players at the 1980 Winter Olympics
Ice hockey players at the 1984 Winter Olympics
Lukko players
Minnesota North Stars draft picks
Olympic ice hockey players of Czechoslovakia
Olympic silver medalists for Czechoslovakia
Olympic medalists in ice hockey
SHC Fassa players
Sportspeople from Most (city)
Medalists at the 1984 Winter Olympics
Czechoslovak expatriate sportspeople in Italy
Czechoslovak expatriate sportspeople in Finland
Expatriate ice hockey players in Italy
Expatriate ice hockey players in Finland
Czechoslovak ice hockey defencemen